Munishwar Nath Bhandari (born on 13 September 1960) is an Indian Judge. He is former Chief Justice of Madras High Court. He has also served as Acting Chief Justice of Madras High Court and Allahabad High Court and Judge of Allahabad High Court and Rajasthan High Court.

Judgeship
He was elevated as Judge of Rajasthan High Court on 5 July 2007. He was transferred as Judge of Allahabad High Court on 15 March 2019. He was appointed Acting Chief Justice of Allahabad High Court on 26 June 2021.

On 16 November 2021 he was transferred to Madras High Court and on 22 November 2021 he took charge as Acting Chief Justice of Madras High Court. On 1 February 2022 he was elevated as Chief Justice of the Madras High Court. On 14 February 2022 he took charge as the 51st Chief Justice of the prestigious  Madras High Court. Tamilnadu Governor R. N. Ravi administered the oath of office to Justice Bhandari and Tamilnadu Chief Minister M. K. Stalin took part in the swearing-in ceremony at Raj Bhavan, Tamilnadu.

He was retired on 12 September 2022.

References 

 

Indian judges
1960 births
Living people